Giorgi Gamqrelidze (born February 4, 1986) is a Georgian professional basketball player who last played for Titebi Tbilisi and the Georgian national team, where he participated at the EuroBasket 2011.

References

1986 births
Living people
BSC Fürstenfeld Panthers players
Giessen 46ers players
Men's basketball players from Georgia (country)
Mitteldeutscher BC players
Point guards
Basketball players from Tbilisi